Moyle Park College is a secondary school in Clondalkin, South Dublin, Ireland.
The school was established by the Marist Brothers in 1957, and grew alongside the population of the local area. As of school year 2017, no more Marist Brothers taught in the school.

In 2007 Moyle Park College celebrated its Golden Jubilee. On 13 October a ceremony was held in the sports hall to mark the occasion. This was attended by the then President of Ireland Mary McAleese who also opened the Golden Jubilee Garden. Niamh Cahalane who took over as principal from Maurice Hartigan in August 2016.

Notable past pupils include Irish politician and government minister John Curran, Dublin Senior Football Manager Jim Gavin, Longford Senior Football Manager Jack Sheedy, Former Dublin Senior Footballer Derek Murray, Olympic boxer Kenny Egan and TV presenter Brian Ormond.

During the summer months, the college is host to Morry Park English Language College. This summer project sees more than 300 international students come to the college to learn English as a second language. Students come from Argentina, Brazil, Spain, France and Italy and stay in the Clondalkin, Palmerstown, Tallaght and Lucan areas of Dublin.

References

External links
Moyle Park College

Clondalkin
Secondary schools in South Dublin (county)
Schools of English as a second or foreign language